Opsaridium boweni is a species of ray-finned fish in the family Cyprinidae. It is found in the Lulua River in Democratic Republic of the Congo.

References

Opsaridium
Taxa named by Henry Weed Fowler
Fish described in 1930
Fish of the Democratic Republic of the Congo
Endemic fauna of the Democratic Republic of the Congo